What Separates Me from You Tour was a concert tour by band A Day to Remember, taking place from late 2010, in support of their fourth studio album What Separates Me from You and finishing in September 2012. The tour started shortly after the Homesick Tour ended, earlier in August 2010.

The band embarked on the tour on November 2, 2010, with a first North American leg, with support slots by Underoath and The Word Alive. Before the official first leg, the band played 3 warm-up dates, at the Epicenter Festival in California, alongside KISS, Blink-182, Rise Against, Papa Roach and more, a special Las Vegas date with support from Pierce the Veil and KFMA's Fall Ball, with Deftones, Circa Survive and more. The headlining tour took place between November 2–28, 2010, after which the band embarked on a series of radio stations festival dates in early December.

Following the US tour, the band played 4 dates in Australia as part of the No Sleep Til Festival, then embarking on a headlining tour of Europe in January–February 2011. This was followed by a headlining spring tour in North America, with dates both in the US and Canada, entitled The Gamechangers Tour, the tour featured support acts Bring Me the Horizon, We Came as Romans and Pierce the Veil.

During the Gamechangers Tour, the band played a special date at the Irving Plaza in New York City on March 15, in which the band played 3 different sets, with their main set, and two opening sets by themselves. The first was an acoustic set, the second was a set of rarities and never before played live songs by the band, and the third was the band's main set.

The band also played on the Warped Tour 2011 in the summer of 2011, and in October–November 2011 headlined the European Eastpak Antidote Tour with supporting acts August Burns Red, The Ghost Inside and Living with Lions.

Set list

Tour dates

Festivals and other miscellaneous performances

This concert was a part of "X102.9 FM: The Big Ticket"
This concert was a part of "103.1 The Buzz: Buzz Bake Sale"
This concert was a part of "97x Next Big Thing"
This concert was a part of "96.5 The Night the Buzz Stole Christmas"
This concert was a part of "KROQ Almost Acoustic Christmas"
This concert was a part of "91x Wrex the Halls"
This concert was a part of "No Sleep Til Festival"
This concert was a part of "Austin City Limits Music Festival"
This concert was a part of "Earthday Birthday"
This concert was a part of "Edgefest"

This concert was a part of "The Bamboozle"
This concert was a part of "Rock on the Range"
This concert was a part of "Rockin' Roots Festival"
This concert was a part of "KROQ Weenie Roast"
This concert was a part of "102.1 FM How the Edge Stole Christmas"
This concert was a part of "X107.5 Holiday Havoc"
This concert was a part of "104.1 Nightmare Before Xmas"
This concert was a part of "Soundwave Festival"
This concert was a part of "Boonstock Music and Arts Festival"
This concert was a part of "Riot Fest"

Cancellations and rescheduled shows

Box office score data

Support acts

 Adept (February 9, 12–22, 2011)
 Antagonist A.D. (February 23, 2012)
 August Burns Red (October 20–November 18, 2011)
 Bayside (January 30–February 12, 2011)
 Bring Me the Horizon (March 10–13, 16–April 18, 2011)
 Close Your Eyes (November 2–28, 2010)
 Deny (June 12, 2011)
 Glassjaw (February 3, 2012)
 Her Name In Blood (March 21, 2012)
 Living with Lions (October 20–November 18, 2011)
 Pierce the Veil (October 22, 2010; January 29–February 22, March 10–13, 16–April 18, 2011)
 Snakes of Iron (February 23, 2012)

 The Ghost Inside (October 20–November 18, 2011)
 The Menzingers (January 17–February 5, 2012)
 The Used (February 27–28, 2012)
 The Word Alive (November 2–19, 21–28, 2010)
 'Til Death Do Us Party (February 23, 2012)
 Title Fight (April 15–May 10, 2012)
 Underoath (November 2–19, 21–28, 2010; May 8–17, 2011; March 9, 2012)
 We Came as Romans (March 10–13, 16–April 18, 2011)
 Yashin (January 31, 2011)
 You Me at Six (February 27–28, 2012)

Sources:

Personnel
Jeremy McKinnon – lead vocals
Kevin Skaff – lead guitar, vocals
Neil Westfall – rhythm guitar, backing vocals
Joshua Woodard – bass
Alex Shelnutt – drums, percussion

Songs Played

From And Their Name Was Treason
"Heartless"
"You Should Have Killed Me When You Had the Chance"
"1958"

From For Those Who Have Heart
"Fast Forward to 2012"
"Speak of the Devil"
"The Danger in Starting a Fire"
"The Plot to Bomb the Panhandle"
"Monument"
"Show 'Em the Ropes"
"A Shot in the Dark"
"Here's to the Past"
"I Heard It's the Softest Thing Ever"
"Since U Been Gone" (Kelly Clarkson cover)
"Why Walk on Water When We've Got Boats"

From Homesick
"The Downfall of Us All"
"My Life for Hire"
"I'm Made of Wax, Larry, What Are You Made Of?"
"NJ Legion Iced Tea"
"Mr. Highway's Thinking About the End"
"Have Faith in Me"
"Welcome to the Family"
"Homesick"
"Holdin' It Down for the Underground"
"You Already Know What You Are"
"Another Song About the Weekend
"If It Means a Lot to You"

From What Separates Me from You
"Sticks & Bricks"
"All I Want"
"It's Complicated"
"This Is the House That Doubt Built"
"2nd Sucks"
"All Signs Point to Lauderdale"
"You Be Tails, I'll Be Sonic"

Others
"Right Where You Want Me to Be"
"No Cigar" (Millencolin cover)

References

2010 concert tours
2011 concert tours
2012 concert tours
A Day to Remember concert tours